The Scout and Guide movement in Bermuda is served by

 Girlguiding Bermuda
 Bermuda Scout Association

See also